Casimir Koza (27 January 1935 – 30 November 2010) was a French footballer. He played in one match for the France national football team in 1962.

References

External links
 
 

1935 births
2010 deaths
French footballers
France international footballers
Association footballers not categorized by position
Sportspeople from Pas-de-Calais
French people of Polish descent
Footballers from Hauts-de-France
RC Lens players
Red Star F.C. players
Racing Club de France Football players
RC Strasbourg Alsace players
Limoges FC players